The Central Michigan Chippewas women's basketball team is the intercollegiate women's basketball program representing Central Michigan University. The school competes in the Mid-American Conference in Division I of the National Collegiate Athletic Association (NCAA). The Chippewas play home basketball games at the McGuirk Arena near the campus in Mount Pleasant, Michigan.

History
As of the 2015–16 season, the Chippewas have a 615–627 overall record. They have won the Mid-American Conference women's basketball tournament in 1983, 1984, and 2013, while finishing runner-up in 1985, 1986, 1987, 1991, 2012, and 2016.

NCAA tournament results

References

External links